Mateos is a Spanish surname and Albanian and Ethiopian given name. Notable people with the name include:

Surname
Adolfo López Mateos (1910–1969), President of Mexico from 1958 to 1964
Adrián Mateos (born 1994), Spanish poker player
Antonio Mateos, set decorator
David Mateos Ramajo (born 1987), Spanish footballer
Diego Corrientes Mateos (1757–1781), Spanish bandit famous for his generosity to the poor
Enrique Mateos (1934–2001), Spanish footballer
Gerardo Ruiz Mateos, Mexican engineer and politician
José María Ruiz Mateos (1931–2015), Spanish businessman
Julián Mateos (1938–1996), Spanish actor and film producer
Marta Mateos (born 1984), Spanish football striker
Miguel Mateos (born 1953), Angentine rock and pop music singer/songwriter
Pilar Mateos (Valladolid, born 1942), Spanish writer of Children's literature
Raúl Fernández-Cavada Mateos (born 1988), Spanish footballer
Roberto Mateos (born 1963), Mexican actor of telenovelas
Yolanda Mateos (born 1972), Spanish former footballer

Given name
Mateos Toçi (born 1993), Albanian footballer

See also 
Ciudad López Mateos, city in the State of México, México and the seat of the municipality called Atizapán de Zaragoza
Mateo (disambiguation)

Spanish-language surnames
Albanian masculine given names
Ethiopian given names